A femme fatale ( or), sometimes called a maneater or vamp, is a stock character of a mysterious, beautiful, and seductive woman whose charms ensnare her lovers, often leading them into compromising, deadly traps. She is an archetype of literature and art. Her ability to enchant, entice and hypnotize her victim with a spell was in the earliest stories seen as verging on supernatural; hence, the femme fatale today is still often described as having a power akin to an enchantress, seductress, witch, having power over men. Femmes fatales are typically villainous, or at least morally ambiguous, and always associated with a sense of mystification, and unease.

The term originates from the French phrase femme fatale, which means 'deadly woman' or 'lethal woman'. A femme fatale tries to achieve her hidden purpose by using feminine wiles such as beauty, charm, or sexual allure. In many cases, her attitude towards sexuality is lackadaisical, intriguing, or frivolous. In some cases, she uses lies or coercion rather than charm. She may also make use of some subduing weapon such as sleeping gas, a modern analog of magical powers in older tales. She may also be (or imply that she is) a victim, caught in a situation from which she cannot escape. A younger or underage version of a femme fatale is called a fille fatale, from the French phrase for 'deadly girl'.

In American early 20th-century films, a femme fatale character was referred to as a vamp, a reference to The Vampire, Philip Burne-Jones's 1897 painting, and Rudyard Kipling's later 1897 poem, and the 1909 play and 1915 film A Fool There Was.

Female mobsters (including Italian-American Mafia or Russian Mafia) have been portrayed as femmes fatales in films noir. Femmes fatales appear in James Bond films.

History

Ancient archetypes

The femme fatale archetype exists in the culture, folklore and myths of many cultures. Ancient mythical or legendary examples include Inanna, Lilith, Circe, Medea, Clytemnestra, Lesbia, Tamamo no Mae, and Visha Kanyas. Historical examples from classical times include Cleopatra and Messalina, as well as the biblical figures Delilah, Jezebel, and Salome. An example from Chinese literature and traditional history is Daji.

Early Western culture to the 19th century
The femme fatale was a common figure in the European Middle Ages, often portraying the dangers of unbridled female sexuality. The pre-medieval inherited biblical figure of Eve offers an example, as does the wicked, seductive enchantress typified in Morgan le Fay. The Queen of the Night in Mozart's The Magic Flute shows her more muted presence during the Age of Enlightenment.

The femme fatale flourished in the Romantic period in the works of John Keats, notably "La Belle Dame sans Merci" and "Lamia". Along with them, there rose the gothic novel The Monk featuring Matilda, a very powerful femme fatale. This led to her appearing in the work of Edgar Allan Poe, and as the vampire, notably in Carmilla and Brides of Dracula. The Monk was greatly admired by the Marquis de Sade, for whom the femme fatale symbolised not evil, but all the best qualities of women; his novel Juliette is perhaps the earliest wherein the femme fatale triumphs. Pre-Raphaelite painters frequently used the classic personifications of the femme fatale as a subject.

In the Western culture of the late 19th and early 20th centuries, the femme fatale became a more fashionable trope, and she is found in the paintings of the artists Edvard Munch, Gustav Klimt, Franz von Stuck, and Gustave Moreau. The novel À rebours by Joris-Karl Huysmans includes these fevered imaginings about an image of Salome in a Moreau painting:

In 1891, Oscar Wilde, in his play Salome: she manipulates her lust-crazed uncle, King Herod, with her enticing Dance of the Seven Veils (Wilde's invention) to agree to her imperious demand: "bring me the head of John the Baptist". Later, Salome was the subject of an opera by Strauss, and was popularized on stage, screen, and peep show booths in countless incarnations.

She also is seen as a prominent figure in late 19th- and 20th-century opera, appearing in Richard Wagner's Parsifal (Kundry), Georges Bizet's "Carmen", Camille Saint-Saëns' "Samson et Delilah" and Alban Berg's "Lulu" (based on the plays "Erdgeist" and "Die Büchse der Pandora" by Frank Wedekind).

Other considerably famous femmes fatales include Isabella of France, Hedda Gabler of Kristiania (now Oslo), Marie Antoinette of Austria, and, most famously, Lucrezia Borgia.

20th-century genres

Early 20th century 

Mrs Patrick Campbell, George Bernard Shaw's "second famed platonic love affair", (she published some of his letters) and Philip Burne-Jones's lover and subject of his 1897 painting, The Vampire, inspired Burne-Jones's cousin Rudyard Kipling to write his poem "The Vampire", in the year Dracula was published.

  The poem, which began: "A fool there was ...", inspired Porter Emerson Browne to write the play, A Fool There Was, becoming a 1909 Broadway production, and leading to the 1915 film, A Fool There Was starring Theda Bara, as "The Vamp".

The short poem may have been used in the publicity for the 1915 film. 1910s American slang for femme fatale was  vamp, for vampire.

Another icon is Margaretha Geertruida Zelle. While working as an exotic dancer, she took the stage name Mata Hari. She was accused of German espionage during World War I and was put to death by a French firing squad. After her death she became the subject of many sensational films and books.

The 1913 film The Vampire by Robert Vignola, contains a "vamp" dance. Protagonist Alice Hollister was publicised as "the original vampire".

Femmes fatales appear in detective fiction, especially in its 'hard-boiled' sub-genre which largely originated with the crime stories of Dashiell Hammett in the 1920s. At the end of that decade, the French-Canadian villainess Marie de Sabrevois gave a contemporary edge to the otherwise historical novels of Kenneth Roberts set during the American Revolution.

Film villainess often appeared foreign, often of Eastern European or Asian ancestry. They were a contrast to the wholesome personas of actresses such as Lillian Gish and Mary Pickford. Notable silent-cinema vamps include Theda Bara, Helen Gardner, Louise Glaum, Valeska Suratt, Musidora, Virginia Pearson, Olga Petrova, Rosemary Theby, Nita Naldi, Pola Negri, Estelle Taylor, Jetta Goudal, and, in early appearances, Myrna Loy.

Post World War II 

During the film-noir era of the 1940s and early-1950s, the femme fatale flourished in American cinema. Examples include Brigid O'Shaughnessy, portrayed by Mary Astor, who murders Sam Spade's partner in The Maltese Falcon (1941); manipulative narcissistic daughter Veda (portrayed by Ann Blyth) in Mildred Pierce who exploits her indulgent mother Mildred (portrayed by Joan Crawford) and fatally destroys her mother's remarriage to stepfather Monte Barragon (portrayed by Zachary Scott); Gene Tierney as Ellen Brent Harland in Leave Her to Heaven (1945), and the cabaret singer portrayed by Rita Hayworth in Gilda (1946), narcissistic wives who manipulate their husbands; Phyllis Dietrichson (Barbara Stanwyck) in Double Indemnity (1944), Ava Gardner in The Killers and Cora (Lana Turner) in The Postman Always Rings Twice, based on novels by Ernest Hemingway and James M. Cain respectively, manipulate men into killing their husbands.

In the Hitchcock film The Paradine Case (1947), Alida Valli's character causes the deaths of two men and the near destruction of another. Another frequently cited example is the character Jane played by Lizabeth Scott in Too Late for Tears (1949); during her quest to keep some dirty money from its rightful recipient and her husband, she uses poison, lies, sexual teasing and a gun to keep men wrapped around her finger. Jane Greer remains notable as a murderous femme fatale using her wiles on Robert Mitchum in Out of the Past (1947). In Hitchcock's 1940 film and Daphne du Maurier's 1938 novel Rebecca, the eponymous femme fatale completely dominates the plot, even though she is already dead and we never see an image of her. Rocky and Bullwinkle Natasha Fatale, a curvaceous spy, takes her name from the femme fatale stock character.

1980s to the present 

The femme fatale has carried on to the present day, in films such as Body Heat (1981) and Prizzi's Honor (1985) – both with Kathleen Turner, Blade Runner (1982) with Sean Young, Blue Velvet (1986) with Isabella Rossellini, Fatal Attraction (1987) with Glenn Close, The Witches with Anjelica Huston, Basic Instinct (1992) with Sharon Stone, Damage (1992) with Juliette Binoche, The Last Seduction (1994) with Linda Fiorentino, To Die For (1995) with Nicole Kidman, Lost Highway (1997) with Patricia Arquette, Devil in the Flesh (1998) and Jawbreaker (1999), both with Rose McGowan, Original Sin (2001) with Angelina Jolie, Femme Fatale (2002) with Rebecca Romijn, and Jennifer's Body (2009), with Megan Fox. In 2013, Tania Raymonde played the title role in Jodi Arias: Dirty Little Secret. In 2014, Eva Green portrayed a femme fatale in Sin City: A Dame to Kill For and Rosamund Pike starred in Gone Girl.

Academy Award-winning actress Marion Cotillard has frequently played femmes fatales, in such films as A Private Affair (2002), A Very Long Engagement, The Black Box, Inception, Midnight in Paris, The Dark Knight Rises and Macbeth. Nicole Kidman has also played a few femmes fatales in films as To Die For, The Paperboy, Moulin Rouge! and The Northman.

The archetype is also abundantly found in American television. One of the most famous femmes fatales of American television is Sherilyn Fenn's Audrey Horne of the David Lynch cult series Twin Peaks. In the TV series Femme Fatales, actress Tanit Phoenix played Lilith, the host who introduced each episode Rod Serling-style and occasionally appeared within the narrative. In the Netflix TV series Orange Is the New Black, actress Laura Prepon played Alex Vause, a modern femme fatale, who led both men and women to their destruction.

Femmes fatales appear frequently in comic books. Notable examples include Batman's long-time nemesis Catwoman, who first appeared in comics in 1940, and various adversaries of The Spirit, such as P'Gell.

This stock character is also often found in the genres of opera and musical theatre, where she will traditionally have a mezzo, alto or contralto range, opposed to the ingénue's soprano, to symbolize the masculinity and lack of feminine purity. An example is Hélène from Natasha, Pierre and the Great Comet of 1812.

Use in criminal trials
The term has been used by the media in connection with highly publicised criminal trials, such as the trials of Jodi Arias and Amanda Knox.

See also

References

Further reading
 Dominique Mainon and James Ursini (2009) Femme fatale, . Examines the context of film noir.
 Giuseppe Scaraffia (2009) Femme fatale, 
 Julie Grossman (2020) The Femme Fatale, . A brief history of the femme fatale in cinema and TV.
 Toni Bentley (2002) Sisters of Salome, . Salome considered as an archetype of female desire and transgression and as the ultimate femme fatale.
 Bram Dijkstra (1986) Idols of Perversity: Fantasies of Feminine Evil in Fin-De-Siecle Culture, . Discusses the Femme fatale-stereotype.
 Bram Dijkstra (1996) Evil Sisters: The Threat of Female Sexuality in Twentieth-Century Culture, .
 Elizabeth K. Mix Evil By Design: The Creation and Marketing of the Femme Fatale, . Discusses the origin of the Femme fatale in 19th-century French popular culture.
 Mario Praz (1933) The Romantic Agony, . See chapters four, 'La Belle Dame Sans Merci', and five, 'Byzantium'.
 Julie Grossman (2009) Rethinking the Femme Fatale in film noir: Ready for her close-up, . Tries to bring about a more nuanced and sympathetic reading of the "femme fatale" in film criticism and popular culture commentary.

Female stock characters
Women and psychology
Cultural depictions of women
Persian literature by genre